Shen Fa-hui (born 2 November 1966) is a Taiwanese politician.

Career
Shen studied law at Tunghai University, and later earned a master's in public administration from National Taiwan University. While in college, he was active in the Wild Lily student movement and later worked for Frank Hsieh as a legislative assistant and with Chen Shui-bian's 1994 Taipei mayoral campaign. Within the Democratic Progressive Party, Shen was affiliated with the New Tide faction. He has also led the DPP's Policy Committee. Following his tenure within the policy committee, Shen became a member of the party's central standing committee.

Shen served on the Taipei County Council from 1998 to 2005, when he was elected to the Legislative Yuan. He ended his reelection campaign in May 2007, after losing a party primary, and returned to work for Frank Hsieh. Shen was elected to the New Taipei City Council in 2010. He lost a legislative bid in 2012, but was reelected to the NTCC in 2014. In 2015, the Taiwan High Court ruled that Shen and nine other city council members were not guilty of displaying their vote in a council speakership election held by secret ballot in 2010. Shen was supportive of Sunflower Student Movement activist and academic Huang Kuo-chang's 2016 legislative campaign. Shen stepped down from the New Taipei City Council at the end of his second term in 2018, and returned to the Legislative Yuan in 2020.

References

1966 births
Living people
New Taipei Members of the Legislative Yuan
Members of the 6th Legislative Yuan
Democratic Progressive Party Members of the Legislative Yuan
Tunghai University alumni
National Taiwan University alumni
New Taipei City Councilors
Party List Members of the Legislative Yuan
Members of the 10th Legislative Yuan